IF Limhamn Bunkeflo 07, commonly known as LB07, is a football club based in Malmö, Sweden. It is the biggest football club from the Scania region. The club is affiliated with Skånes Fotbollförbund and play their home games at Limhamns IP. The club colours, reflected in their crest and kit, are red and white. The club promoted to the second level of Swedish women's football in 2011 (which later became known as the Elitettan). They did this by winning against IF Norvalla (5–0) and losing to Mallbackens IF with a small goal difference (2–3) in the final promotion group. For five years after the promotion LB07 continued playing in the Elitettan.

In 2016, they won the league championship and gained promotion to the top level Damallsvenskan. The club has an associated men's team who play in the lower categories.

Squad

Former players

Technical staff
As of December 2018

Honours
Elitettan (Tier 2)
Winners: 2016

References

External links
  – Official website 

 
Women's football clubs in Sweden
Football clubs in Skåne County
2008 establishments in Sweden
Sport in Malmö
Association football clubs established in 2008
Football clubs in Malmö